Đinh Tiên Hoàng (HQ-011) is the first  (Gepard 3.9 type) in the Vietnam People's Navy. The VPN contracted the Zelenodolsk shipyard in Russia to build the ship.

Design and description
Đinh Tiên Hoàng (HQ-011) is designed to perform search tasks, track and destroy floating target ships, air defense, anti-submarine (limited), escort, and patrol territorial waters and special areas with economic rights. The ship can enter combat independently or in squadrons, and is equipped with stealth technology, to present a minimum presence on enemy radar screens.

Vietnam and Russia signed a contract on 12 May 2006 worth US$350 million to build two Gepard-class frigates designed by the  Institute ZPKB in Zelenodolsk.

At the request of the Vietnam People's Navy the ship known as Project 11661 was completely redesigned to become Gepard 3.9. The redesigned ships include stealth technology and the most advanced weapons available from Russia today, including air defense systems, Palma  Close-in weapon system AK-630, Kh-35 anti-ship missiles, and Kamov Ka-27 helicopters. The anti-submarine technology includes the RBU-6000 anti-submarine rocket launcher. These two ships are the latest generation of the Gepard class produced at the Zelenodolsk plant. It took two years to build the prototypes under Project 11661.

Construction and career
Đinh Tiên Hoàng (HQ-011) was launched on 12 December 2010. The ship is named after Đinh Tiên Hoàng, the first Vietnamese emperor following the defeat of the Twelve Warlords. He was the founder of the short-lived Đinh dynasty and a significant figure in the establishment of Vietnamese political unity in the tenth century.

Đinh Tiên Hoàng (HQ-011) visited Indonesia from 12 to 15 November, Brunei from 19 to 21 November and the Philippines from 24 to 26 November 2014.

Đinh Tiên Hoàng (HQ-011) will engage in an exchange with Singapore's naval force from 23 to 26 January 2016 and participate in the International Fleet Review 2016 in early February.

References

External links

2010 ships
Gepard-class frigates of the Vietnam People's Navy